Strabomantis ruizi, also known as Ruiz's robber frog, is a species of frog in the family Strabomantidae.
It is endemic to Colombia.
Its natural habitat is subtropical or tropical moist montane forest.
It is threatened by habitat loss.

References

External links
 

ruizi
Amphibians of Colombia
Endemic fauna of Colombia
Taxonomy articles created by Polbot
Amphibians described in 1981